Catalina Castaño and Mervana Jugić-Salkić were the defending champions, having won the event in 2012, but both players decided not to participate in 2013.

Lucie Hradecká and Michaëlla Krajicek won the tournament, defeating Stéphanie Foretz Gacon and Eva Hrdinová in the final, 6–3, 6–2.

Seeds

Draw

References 
 Draw

2013 ITF Women's Circuit